Lake Pinaroo lies in Sturt National Park in the Far West region of New South Wales, Australia. On 17 March 1996 the lake was recognised as a wetland of international importance by designation (RS799) under the Ramsar Convention.

Description
Pinaroo is an ephemeral lake in the arid north-western corner of New South Wales (NSW) near Cameron Corner. It forms  the largest terminal basin within the NSW part of the Simpson–Strzelecki Dunefields bioregion. It is subject to erratic flood events interspersed with extended dry periods; once full, it may take up to six years to dry out.

The lake filled in March 2021 as a result of the weather system associated with the 2021 Eastern Australian floods with 100mm of rain falling near the lake itself, having been dry for 10 years.

Flora and fauna
Because it holds water for much longer periods than other wetlands in the desert region, it is regionally important as a breeding site and drought refuge for many kinds of animals, especially waterbirds that have bred on, for example, interdune swamps that only retain water for a few months. Waterbirds for which the site is important when inundated include freckled and blue-billed ducks. It is also used as a staging site by migratory waders such as black-tailed godwits, common greenshanks, marsh sandpipers and red-necked stints. It provides opportunities to see large flocks of desert birds such as budgerigars. Other animals recorded at the site are the eastern long-eared bat and interior blind snake.

References

Pinaroo
Ramsar sites in Australia